Văratec may refer to the following places in Romania:

 Văratec, a village in Agapia Commune, Neamț County
Văratec Monastery, located in Văratec, Agapia
 Văratec, a village in Salcea Commune, Suceava County
Văratec (river), a river in Hunedoara County

See also
Văratic (disambiguation)